Way Four is a public art work by artist Bernard Kirschenbaum at the Lynden Sculpture Garden near Milwaukee, Wisconsin. The stainless steel sculpture is an open circle that creates an orbit for two triangles; it is installed on the lawn.

See also
 Twist for Max

References

1976 sculptures
Outdoor sculptures in Milwaukee
Steel sculptures in Wisconsin
1976 establishments in Wisconsin
Stainless steel sculptures in the United States